Shimashan Town is an urban town in Lianyuan, Loudi City, Hunan Province, People's Republic of China.

Administrative division
The town is divided into 63 villages and 4 communities, the following areas: 
 
 Meiyuan Community
 Huangshan Community
 Shuanghe Community
 Hehua Community
 Wujiba Village
 Xinzhong Village
 Majiajing Village
 Shimei Village
 Qingyan Village
 Zhangjiawan Village
 Tangjiachong Village
 Xiaochong Village
 Qingtong Village
 Zihua Village
 Paizhou Village
 Paizhang Village
 Yangling Village
 Jingquan Village
 Xingfu Village
 Yuantou Village
 Shiqiao Village
 Peiyuan Village
 Bengshi Village
 Lijialong Village
 Jianguang Village
 Jifeng Village
 Longbu Village
 Manshui Village
 Fusheng Village
 Dafeng Village
 Leifeng Village
 Qunying Village
 Qunxiong Village
 Shimen Village
 Zhuquan Village
 Gutai Village
 Huquan Village
 Tuoping Village
 Longjiang Village
 Dongjia Village
 Huangli Village
 Xiangche Village
 Niaoxi Village
 Shantao Village
 Shuangli Village
 Guixin Village
 Guanqiao Village
 Chuanmen Village
 Muling Village
 Dongxuan Village
 Matoushan Village
 Feixian Village
 Shuangche Village
 Changche Village
 Maichong Village
 Wenjiang Village
 Yingshan Village
 Xinhe Village
 Tuanjie Village
 Nanmu Village
 Zixi Village
 Baiyang Village
 Zhizi Village
 Huilongjiang Village
 Sijia Village
 Qunxian Village
 Qunlian Village

External links

Divisions of Lianyuan